Gigi Fernández and Natasha Zvereva were the defending champions and successfully defended their title, by defeating Meredith McGrath and Larisa Neiland 5–7, 6–1, 6–4 in the final.

Seeds

Draw

Draw

References
 Official Results Archive (ITF)
 Official Results Archive (WTA)

Porsche Tennis Grand Prix - Doubles
1995 Doubles